Hypoxis mexicana, common name Mexican yellow star-grass, is a small herbaceous plant. It is widespread across much of Mexico, and has also been reported from southern Arizona.

Hypoxis mexicana  grows is open forests and woodlands. It has a tuft of leaves with long bristles near the base. Flowers are yellow, 6-parted, in a panicle at the top of the flowering stalk.

References

mexicana
Flora of Arizona
Flora of Mexico